Timothy David Morris  was Dean of Edinburgh from 1992 to 2001.

Born in 1948 and educated at London University,  he was ordained after a period of study at Trinity College, Bristol Deacon in 1975  and priest in 1976. He was the curate at St Thomas, Edinburgh then held incumbencies in Edinburgh, Troon and Galashiels. before his time as Dean.

Notes

1948 births
Living people
Alumni of the University of London
Alumni of Trinity College, Bristol
Scottish Episcopalian clergy
Deans of Edinburgh